A culminating project (also known as a senior project, grad project or exit project), is a project that challenges high school seniors to demonstrate their academic knowledge in an experiential way (in most cases). According to the United States Department of Education State Education Boards typically allow individual school districts to customize the project, based on basic state guidelines.

Confusion about the culminating project 

People reporting on the culminating project sometimes confuse the terminology with the state high school exit exam. The state exit exam is a written exam that usually tests student’s math, reading, writing, and science skills, whereas the culminating project is a required project that is usually a learning experience based on a topic chosen by the student. The project is mandatory in order to graduate.

Purpose 
The purpose of the project is to increase both teaching and learning. High school graduation standards have declined for several decades. School reform or the No Child Left Behind Act of 2001 is a way to bring value back to the high school diploma as well as support students  as they go out into the world prepared for college, a job, the military, entrepreneurship, internship, or whatever path students decide to follow once they graduate.

Why a project is required 
The requirement is an effort to increase the education standards. As college admissions and the workplace require more from their recruits, nationwide high schools must also.

In an effort to be clear, it is restated that the culminating project is not required by all schools. Again, parents and guardians would have to check with the student’s school official website for graduation requirements.

However, for students that are required to complete a culminating project, this is a chance for the student to explore a topic of personal interest. The project provides an opportunity that student may not have otherwise. By completing the project, students have a real life experience that can help them in their next adventure in life (college, job, entrepreneurship, military, internship, etc.).

Students gain a number of important skills by participating in the process such as,
 Leadership
 Communication
 Project management
 Time management
 Group skills
 Negotiation skills
 Meeting deadlines
 Conflict management
 Public speaking
 Presentation skills
 Self motivation

Kinds of projects 
The high school graduation culminating project format varies from state to state and even school to school within the same state. Parents and guardians will have to check with their students specific school for their requirements. Typically the project consists of choosing a topic of interest, writing a research paper on that topic, having an experience directly related to the topic, keeping a journal of artifacts demonstrating your work, followed by the final step which is a presentation (US Dept of Education).

The student usually presents the project to a panel consisting of 2-5 people typically made up of teachers, community members, faculty, and staff. However, some schools have student present to a panel of their peers. Schools and school districts have total discretion to format the process in a way that works best for their students and their school culture.

In some cases, students complete a project on their own with the support of a mentor from their community. Some schools allow group projects and group presentation. For example, it would not be uncommon for the leadership class of a school to raise funds to build a school in Africa. Other requirements include a mandatory social/community aspect related to the project which means the high school graduation project has to benefit someone other than the student.

References 

Educational administration
Pedagogy